Fra Mauro is the worn remnant of a walled lunar plain. It is part of the surrounding Fra Mauro formation, being located to the northeast of Mare Cognitum and southeast of Mare Insularum. Attached to the southern rim are the co-joined craters Bonpland and Parry, which intrude into the formation forming inward-bulging walls. The crater is named after Italian geographer Fra Mauro.

Description

The surviving rim of Fra Mauro is heavily worn, with incisions from past impacts and openings in the north and east walls. The rim is the most prominent in the southeast, where it shares a wall with Parry. The remainder consists of little more than low, irregular ridges. The maximum elevation of the outer rim is 0.7 km.

The floor of this formation has been covered by basaltic lava. This surface is almost divided by clefts running from the north and south rims. There is no central peak, although the tiny crater Fra Mauro E lies at almost the midpoint of the formation.

Apollo missions

The area north of Fra Mauro crater was the intended landing site of the ill-fated Apollo 13 mission, which was aborted after an oxygen tank aboard the spacecraft exploded. The crew later returned safely to Earth.  The next mission, Apollo 14, landed at Fra Mauro.  The Apollo 14 crew (Alan Shepard and Edgar Mitchell) sampled breccia that had been deposited here by the Imbrium basin-forming impact, and which partly covers Fra Mauro. This rough debris blanket of ejecta is referred to as the "Fra Mauro Formation".

Satellite craters
By convention these features are identified on lunar maps by placing the letter on the side of the crater midpoint that is closest to Fra Mauro.

References

External links

Fra Mauro at The Moon Wiki

Related articles
 
 
 
 

Impact craters on the Moon
Apollo 13
Apollo 14